KXCS (105.5 FM) is a radio station licensed to Coahoma, Texas, United States, serving the Big Spring-Snyder area.  The station is currently owned by Weeks Broadcasting, Inc.

There was an earlier authorization for 105.5 at Coahoma called KBYG-FM and assigned to Drew Ballard, owner of KBYG Big Spring. The station was never constructed or put on air owing to an economic downturn at the time.

References

External links

XCS